Souled Out (2000) was the fourth and final Souled Out professional wrestling pay-per-view (PPV) event produced by World Championship Wrestling (WCW). It took place on January 16, 2000, from the Firstar Center in Cincinnati, Ohio. The event would be replaced by Sin as the January pay-per-view the following year. As of 2015, this event is available on the WWE Network.

The main event was a match between Chris Benoit and Sid Vicious for the vacant WCW World Heavyweight Championship. The match was notable because it was the last match that Benoit wrestled for WCW, as he left for the WWF shortly after he won the championship.

Background
This was the pay-per-view where creative writers Vince Russo and Ed Ferrara were not involved in the scripting of the show as Russo stepped down days before after being told by management that he had to work in a creative team rather than write the show by himself alongside Ferrara. Prior to this evening, the creative direction from October 18, 1999, had been drastically different with a focus on the development of storylines and younger stars due to the involvement of the creative writers.

Storylines
The event featured wrestlers from pre-existing scripted feuds and storylines. Wrestlers portrayed villains, heroes, or less distinguishable characters in the scripted events that built tension and culminated in a wrestling match or series of matches.

The originally scheduled card was heavily changed due to the serious injuries of Bret Hart and Jeff Jarrett. On the December 20, 1999 edition of WCW Monday Nitro, the WCW World Heavyweight Championship was vacated due to a controversial finish to the main event match between Hart and Goldberg at Starrcade, where Goldberg mule-kicked Hart; this resulted in a severe concussion which limited Hart's ability to compete. Hart defeated Goldberg to win the vacant title with the help of Scott Hall and Kevin Nash; this resulted in the formation of a new incarnation of the nWo known as nWo 2000. However, in early 2000, Hart was diagnosed with post-concussion syndrome; this forced him to vacate the title on his own terms. Jarrett, who was scheduled to wrestle Chris Benoit in a Triple Threat Theater series (Dungeon Rules, Bunkhouse, Caged Heat), suffered lingering headaches from Benoit's diving headbutt off the top of the steel cage on the January 10 episode of Nitro, which forced him to vacate the WCW United States Heavyweight Championship. Benoit was instead moved to take Hart's place against Vicious in the championship match and the Triple Threat Theater series was contested between Billy Kidman and three separate wrestlers. Kidman won the first match because Dean Malenko forgot that the match rules stated that a wrestler could win by having his opponent's feet touch the floor; Malenko had rolled out of the ring to collect himself in the early stages of the match, thus losing the match per the rules. The second match of the show was originally scheduled to be a match between Flair & Crowbar and Vampiro & a partner of his choosing for the WCW World Tag Team Championship; when Flair and Crowbar jumped Vampiro during a backstage interview, Vampiro wanted to take them on himself.

Reception
In 2014, Kevin Pantoja of 411Mania gave the event a rating of 0.0 [Torture], stating, "Why would any company put on a show this bad? 12 matches and not one can get to two stars. Nothing on this card is redeemable and it's the worst Pay-Per-View that I've ever seen. Seriously, every single thing on this show is bad and most of it doesn't make sense."

Results

Aftermath
The following night on Nitro, Chris Benoit was (kayfabe) stripped of the WCW World Heavyweight Championship after Arn Anderson determined that Sid Vicious' foot was under the rope when Benoit performed the submission hold. In reality, however, Benoit left for the WWF and relinquished the title due to a management dispute. WCW then refused to recognize Benoit's reign; this reign was later recognized by the WWF after it acquired the rights to the championship in March 2001.

As a result of Benoit leaving WCW for the WWF, a tournament was organized to determine who would receive the vacated championship. On the January 24 edition of Nitro, Sid Vicious defeated the Harris Brothers for the right to face Kevin Nash, who became the commissioner of WCW after defeating Terry Funk at Souled Out. Vicious then defeated Nash to win the vacant title; however, he was stripped of the WCW World Heavyweight Championship on the January 26 edition of WCW Thunder for pinning the wrong Harris brother. This led to a triple threat steel cage match between Vicious, Nash, and Ron Harris for the vacant title; Sid went on to win the championship by forcing Nash to submit, and would remain champion until WCW was rebooted one week before Spring Stampede.

Bret Hart would retire from professional wrestling on October 20, 2000.

References

Souled Out
Events in Cincinnati
2000 in Ohio
Professional wrestling in Cincinnati
January 2000 events in the United States
2000 World Championship Wrestling pay-per-view events